Hartford End is a hamlet in the civil parish of Felsted and the Uttlesford district of Essex, England.

The headquarters of Ridley's Brewery was in Hartford End.

External links 
 
 Listed buildings at Hartford End

Hamlets in Essex
Felsted